Alupe University (AU) is a Kenyan University located in Teso South Constituency,  from Busia Town in Busia County. The university was established through the Alupe University College Order 2015, which was on a Gazette Notice Number 163 of 24 July 2015.

Alupe University was established on 24 July 2015. It is the only public university in Busia County. It was originally the Alupe campus of Moi University and later changed to Alupe University College, a Constituent college of Moi University. The current vice chancellor of the university is Professor Fabian  Esamai and the deputy vice chancellors are Professor Emmy Kipsoi and Professor Peter Barasa.

References

External links 
 Official website

Universities and colleges in Kenya